Goulet may refer to:

Surname
Alfred Goulet (1875−1961), Canadian businessman and political figure
Bertrand Goulet (born 1944), former Member of the National Assembly of Quebec
Brent Goulet (born 1964), soccer player
Catherine Goulet, Canadian author and publishing entrepreneur
Danis Goulet (born 1977), Canadian Cree-Métis film director and screenwriter
Denis Goulet (1931–2006), scholar of human development and development ethics
Elzéar Goulet (1836−1870), Metis martyr
Émilius Goulet (born 1933), former Roman Catholic Archbishop of St. Boniface in Manitoba, Canada
George R. D. Goulet (born 1933), Canadian author and lawyer
Genny Goulet (born 1980), professional wrestler who uses the ring name LuFisto
Jacques Goulet (1615−1688), Canadian pioneer and miller
Jason Goulet (born 1983), Canadian former professional ice hockey defenceman
Jonathan Goulet (born 1979), martial artist
Keith Goulet (born 1946), Canadian former politician, first aboriginal person appointed to the Executive Council of Saskatchewan
Maxime Goulet (1855−1932), Canadian politician
Michel Goulet (born 1944), Canadian sculptor and professor at Université du Québec
Michel Goulet (born 1960), professional ice hockey player
Mickey Goulet (born 1947), French Olympic coach
Nicolette Goulet (1956-2008), Canadian-American film, television and musical theatre actress
Paul Goulet (born 1958), pastor and author
Perrine Goulet (born 1978), French politician representing La République En Marche!
Robert Goulet (1933−2007), American singer, actor
Robert L. Goulet, sports agent
Tag Goulet Canadian author and publishing entrepreneur 
Terry Goulet (born 1934), Canadian author
Yann Goulet (1914−1999), Breton nationalist and sculptor

Places
Le Goulet, New Brunswick, a village in New Brunswick, Canada
Goulet, Orne, a commune in northwestern France
Goulet Bluff, a point on the western side of the Peron Peninsula in the Shark Bay World Heritage Site
Goulet de Brest, sea-channel into the roadstead of Brest
Goulet River (disambiguation)

Other uses
Treaty of Le Goulet, treaty signed by Kings John of England and Philip II of France in May 1200

French-language surnames